White Eagle (1941) is the eighth serial released by Columbia Pictures, starring Buck Jones. It was based on the 1932 Buck Jones Western film (also called White Eagle (1932 film)).

Plot
White Eagle, a Pony Express Rider, is the son of a massacred Army officer who has been raised by an Indian tribe. He believes himself to be the son of the tribal chief, and is working to get a peace treaty signed between the Indians and the white settlers. But 'Dandy' Darnell, a notorious and merciless outlaw, tries to keep the fight alive by sending his henchmen to stir up trouble, partly due to his wish to grab hundreds of thousands of acres in the western territories for himself and also to incite a war with the Indians along the territory. This serial was inspired by the 1932 movie of the same name, again starring Buck Jones in the title role.

Cast
 Buck Jones as White Eagle
 Raymond Hatton as Grizzly
 Dorothy Fay as Janet Rand
 James Craven as Dandy Darnell
 Chief Yowlachie as Chief Running Deer
 Jack Ingram as Gregory Cantro
 Charles King as Brace - Henchman 
 John Merton as Ronimo - Henchman

Chapter titles
 Flaming Teepees
 The Jail Delivery
 The Dive into Quicksands
 The Warning Death Knife
 Treachery at the Stockade
 The Gun-Cane Murder
 The Revealing Blotter
 Bird-calls of Deliverance
 The Fake Telegram
 Mystic Dots and Dashes
 The Ear at the Window
 The Massacre Invitation
 The Framed-up Showdown
 The Fake Army General
 Treachery Downed
Source:

References

External links

1941 Western (genre) films
1941 films
American black-and-white films
Columbia Pictures film serials
1940s English-language films
Films directed by James W. Horne
Works about the Pony Express
American Western (genre) films
1940s American films